Scearce is a surname. Notable people with the surname include:

David Scearce (born 1965), Canadian lawyer and screenwriter
J. Mark Scearce (born 1960), American composer
John Scearce (born 1997), American soccer player